was an  destroyer of the Imperial Japanese Navy. Her name translates as "flower (sakura) moon", or an alternate name for "March".

Design and description
The Akizuki-class ships were originally designed as anti-aircraft escorts for carrier battle groups, but were modified with torpedo tubes and depth charges to meet the need for more general-purpose destroyer. Her crew numbered 300 officers and enlisted men.

The ship had two Kampon geared steam turbines, each driving one propeller shaft, using steam provided by three Kampon water-tube boilers.

The main armament of the Akizuki class consisted of eight Type 98  dual purpose guns in four twin-gun turrets, two superfiring pairs fore and aft of the superstructure. They carried four Type 96  anti-aircraft guns in two twin-gun mounts. The ships were also armed with four  torpedo tubes in a single quadruple traversing mount; one reload was carried for each tube. Their anti-submarine weapons comprised six depth charge throwers for which 72 depth charges were carried.

Construction and career
In June 1947, Hanazuki was turned over to United States as "DD-934", and was later sunk as target off Gotō Islands, Japan on 3 February 1948.

Notes

References

External links
 CombinedFleet.com: Akizuki-class destroyers
 CombinedFleet.com: Hanazuki history

Akizuki-class destroyers (1942)
World War II destroyers of Japan
Shipwrecks in the Yellow Sea
1944 ships
Ships sunk as targets
Maritime incidents in 1948